Mona Masri (born January 16, 1985) is a Swedish journalist, critic and the host of radio show OBS i P1 on Sveriges Radio.  She is also a literary critic on Sveriges Television, and used to write about art and culture in Dagens Nyheter.  Masri is a member of the board of directors of the Swedish Publicists' Association.

References

Swedish journalists
Swedish women writers
1985 births
Living people